The 2012 Ibero-American Championships in Athletics (Spanish: XV Campeonato Iberoamericano de Atletismo) was the fifteenth edition of the international athletics competition between Ibero-American nations. It was held at the Polideportivo Máximo Viloria in Barquisimeto, Venezuela between 8–10 June. Twenty-five nations and a total of 398 athletes participated at the competition.

Initially set to be held in the country's capital Caracas, the competition was moved to Maracay in April 2011. The Venezuelan Sports Ministry had not committed any funds for the event. As a result, the president of the Venezuelan Athletics Federation, Wilfredy León, rescheduled the event following the promise of the Aragua state governor Rafael Isea to help build a new stadium for the championships. However, the new stadium and purpose-built accommodation for the event were not ready within schedule. The event was postponed from May to June, but the project remained off-target and in May 2012 Héctor Rodríguez, the Venezuelan Sports Minister, declared that the competition would be held in Barquisimeto (the host of the 2003 South American Championships).

The highlight performances were two South American records by Brazilians in the women's section. Andressa de Morais threw a record in the discus throw and Lucimara da Silva's heptathlon score was also a Championship record. Barquisimeto native Rosa Rodríguez also set a championship record in the women's hammer throw, while Colombia's James Rendon was the only man to break a competition record, bettering the 20,000 metres walk time.

Argentine thrower German Lauro won both the men's shot put and discus events. Ecuador's Álex Quiñónez was the only other athlete to take two individual titles (100 m and 200 m), although Evelyn dos Santos came close by winning the 200 m and finishing second in the 100 m. Becoming one of the oldest gold medallists at the competition, 39-year-old Romary Rifka, who first participated in 1988, won the women's high jump. Brazil, which sent the largest delegation, topped the medal table with fourteen gold medals and a total of 44 overall. Cuba (leaders in 2010) came second with eight golds and eighteen medals. Colombia was third, on six golds, and the hosts Venezuela performed well on home turf, taking fourth place in the table and ten medals from the competition. In addition to the two area records, eleven national records were broken during the competition.

Medal summary

Men

Women

Medal table

Participating nations
Twenty-four members of the Asociación Iberoamericana de Atletismo sent athletes to the event. The level of athlete participation (362 in total) was relatively high compared to previous years although non-American countries representation was rather poor. Aruba participated for the first time. The five member nations not competing were Andorra, Cape Verde, Equatorial Guinea, Guatemala, Guinea-Bissau and São Tomé and Príncipe.

 (2)
 (24)
 (1)
 (3)
 (70)
 (10)
 (32)
 (3)
 (24)
 (19)
 (18)
 (8)
 (21)
 (2)
 (3)
 (7)
 (9)
 (5)
 (4)
 (12)
 (2)
 (16)
 (4)
 (63)

References

Results
IbAmC Barquisimeto VEN 8 - 10 June 15th Campeonato Iberoamericano de Atletismo. Tilastopaja. Retrieved on 2012-06-12.

External links
Official website
Results

Ibero-American Championships in Athletics
Ibero-American
Ibero-American
Sport in Barquisimeto
International athletics competitions hosted by Venezuela
Ath
June 2012 sports events in South America